Gillian May Armstrong (born 18 December 1950) is an Australian feature film and documentary director, who specializes in period drama. Her films often feature female perspectives and protagonists. Many of her movies are historical dramas.

Early life 
Armstrong was born in Melbourne, Victoria, Australia on 18 December 1950. She went to a local high school, Vermont High School (now Vermont Secondary College), and was the middle child of a local real estate agent father and a primary school teacher mother who gave up work to have a family. Armstrong stated in The Australian that her parents were always very supportive of their hopes and dreams, which was not always the way it was for women in the 1960s and 70s. Her father was a frustrated photographer who wasn't allowed to follow his dreams professionally, yet always practised as an amateur. Armstrong reminisces of how she grew up in a dark room, learning all about photography. When she first decided to go to art school, Armstrong didn't have a very firm grasp on what she wanted to do.

Armstrong grew up in the eastern suburb of Mitcham. Armstrong was a technical theatre student at Swinburne Technical College while paying her tuition by working as a waitress. Originally, she attended school to become a theatrical set designer but the school that she attended also offered a film course. After she took it she was enamored by the great names of cinema and decided to enter the film industry. Then she won a scholarship to join the first 12 students at the country's first and only film school, the Australian Film and Television School. While she was in school, the Australian film industry was non existent, and she recalls how weird the accent sounded in new films, because it wasn't American, it was Australian. She attended Swinburne Technical College with the intention of becoming a theatre costume designer, but it was here she became increasingly interested in film. During this time, she was exposed to a range of artistic films that differentiated from the commercial cinema and television she was used to.

After graduating from art school in 1968, Armstrong was set on pursuing a career in film. She began making short films of 2–10 minutes, and started work as an assistant editor in a commercial film house, which lasted a year.

Career 
Following a string of small jobs within the Australian film industry, she achieved her first directorial recognition through her short film The Singer and the Dancer which won an award at the Sydney Film Festival.

Armstrong became a film director at the age of 27. During the time of the development of Australian Cinema Armstrong recalls in a Washington Post interview that tremendous tax breaks led to a frightful overproduction. Everybody was interested in doing deals and even stockbrokers were becoming directors. However, very few of them had the commitment to cinema that Armstrong and others had, and the films would be shown for a week or two, or not released at all. After Armstrong's second film My Brilliant Career, she had offers from Hollywood but quickly turned them all away, preferring to stay in Australia to make a deliberately small film called Starstruck. After the release of Starstruck, Armstrong went around giving interviews dressed in a large fuzzy blue sweater dress decorated with coloured beads, a black-and-white polka dot blouse, black tights and blue suede shoes all topped by a punk shag haircut.

Following this success, Armstrong was commissioned by the South Australian Film Corporation to make a documentary exploring the lives of young teenage girls living in Adelaide, South Australia. This became Smokes and Lollies (1976), her first paid job as director.

Armstrong's own interest in the girls led her to revisit them at ages 18, 26, 33 and 48, resulting in four more films in the style of the popular "Up Series". These are Fourteen's Good, Eighteen's Better (1980), Bingo, Bridesmaids and Braces (1988), Not Fourteen Again (1996), and her most recent film Love, Lust & Lies (2009)

Armstrong's first feature-length film My Brilliant Career (1979), an adaptation of Miles Franklin's novel of the same name, was the first Australian feature-length film to be directed by a woman for 46 years. Armstrong received six awards at the 1979 Australian Film Awards (previously the Australian Film Institute Awards, or AFI's) including Best Director. The film also brought considerable attention to its two main stars, Judy Davis and Sam Neill who were relatively unknown at the time. Following the success of My Brilliant Career, which was nominated for an Academy Award in Best Costume Design, Armstrong directed the Australian rock-musical Starstruck which proved her ability to tackle more contemporary and experimental subject matter and styles.

She has directed a number of rock music videos in the early 1980s, including 1984's "Bop Girl" by Pat Wilson, which featured Nicole Kidman.

Since then, Armstrong has specialised in period drama. She was the first foreign woman to be approached by the American film company MGM to finance her direction of a big-budget feature, which became Mrs. Soffel (1984) starring Mel Gibson and Diane Keaton. This film tells the true story of an affair between a prisoner and a prison warden's wife, and was relatively well received by audiences and critics.

On returning to Australia, Armstrong continued to make both documentaries and feature films. She earned great recognition for High Tide (1987) and The Last Days of Chez Nous (1992), for which she was nominated for Best Director at the 1987 and 1992 Australian Film Institute Awards (AFIs). The Last Days of Chez Nous also earned her a nomination at the Berlin Film Festival. Despite this, both films were largely unrecognised internationally

Armstrong discusses the making of High Tide in the 2003 Canadian documentary Complete Unknown co-directed by Griffin Ondaatje and Craig Proctor.

In 1994, Armstrong achieved her greatest Hollywood success with the adaptation of Little Women, starring Winona Ryder, Susan Sarandon, Gabriel Byrne, Christian Bale, Claire Danes and Kirsten Dunst. This adaptation of Louisa May Alcott's novel was one of the most popular films of the year, and emphasises Armstrong's focus on portraying the intimate lives of strong female characters and their relationships with one another.

She followed this success three years later with the film Oscar and Lucinda (1997), starring Ralph Fiennes and a relatively unknown Cate Blanchett. This film, based on the novel by Australian writer Peter Carey, tells the story of a mismatched love affair in 19th-century Australia. It received mixed reviews both locally and internationally, despite its high production value and strong performances by the film main actors.

In the 2000s, Armstrong went on to direct the feature films Charlotte Gray (2001), starring Cate Blanchett, and Death Defying Acts (2008), starring Catherine Zeta-Jones and Guy Pearce. Based on the novel by Sebastian Faulks, Charlotte Gray is another of Armstrong's films that centres around a strong female protagonist.

Removed from Armstrong's usual subject matter, Death Defying Acts portrays a moment in the life of 1920s escape artist Harry Houdini in the style of a supernatural, romantic thriller. It received a modest earning at the box office, and was part of a special screening at the 2007 Toronto International Film Festival

Despite the success of these more commercial films, it was Armstrong's lesser-known documentary Unfolding Florence: The Many Lives of Florence Broadhurst (2006), which earned her the most critical recognition during this time, and a nomination for the Grand Jury Prize at the Sundance Film Festival.

Film themes and style

Themes 
Armstrong has voiced her desire to reach a wide audience in her interviews, one that includes both men and women of all nationalities. However, her work continually addresses sexual politics and family tensions. Films focused on the escape and struggle with traditional sex roles and its related drawbacks and progressions such as One hundred a Day, My Brilliant Career, High Tide, and Oscar and Lucinda continue to reflect the theme. Furthermore, many people have called her a creator of "strong females" but she insists that she is simply making films about complex characters and the choices that they make.

Style 
Armstrong has a distinctive style in her work that resists easy categorisation. Most of her films cannot simply be stated as being either "women's films" or Australian ones which are the two most generalised categories for women in her line of work. Armstrong's films are described as mixing and intermingling genres in ways that recreate them as something vastly different than what they have been considered. Nevertheless, the films that Armstrong creates can also be considered conventional films in their appeal to the audience. Her films possess sensitive and delicate cinematography, fluid editing, an evocative feel for setting and costume, and a commitment to solid character development and acting. According to film scholar Gwendolyn Audrey Foster, Armstrong has a "strong feminist bent" and a "mordant sense of humor".

Personal life 
Armstrong is married to John Pleffer, and they have two daughters.

Filmography

Awards and nominations

References

Sources
 The Story of Kerry, Josie and Diana – 14–47 at DVD Resurrections, by Wizard of Gore.
 ''Love, Lust & Lies' at DVD Resurrections, by Wizard of Gore.
 "Gillian Armstrong Meets up with Old Friends The 7:30 Report, By Sexton, Mike.
 Video Gillian Armstrong Video Compilation
 "Armstrong and Cox: if a Picture Paints a Thousand Words" Dual Interview Big Ideas

External links 

Gillian Armstrong's Agent

Senses of Cinema: Great Directors Critical Database
Literature on Gillian Armstrong

1950 births
Living people
Australian women film directors
Australian documentary filmmakers
Australian feminist writers
Film directors from Melbourne
Australian Film Television and Radio School alumni
Swinburne University of Technology alumni
Victorian College of the Arts alumni
Australian women screenwriters
Feminist filmmakers
University of Melbourne women
Women documentary filmmakers
People educated at Sydney Church of England Girls Grammar School